The Bristol Cherub is a British two-cylinder, air-cooled, aircraft engine designed and built by the Bristol Aeroplane Company. Introduced in 1923 it was a popular engine for ultralight and small aircraft in the 1930s.

Variants
Cherub I
Initial direct drive version introduced in 1923.
Cherub II 
Geared down (2:1) version of the Cherub I.
Cherub III
An improved and slightly larger (1.228 L) direct drive version introduced in 1925.

Applications

Survivors
An airworthy Messerschmitt M17 replica is owned and operated by the EADS Heritage Flight at Manching and is powered by an original Bristol Cherub III.

Engines on display
A preserved Bristol Cherub is on static display at the Shuttleworth Collection, Old Warden, Bedfordshire.

Specifications (Cherub III)

See also

References

Notes

Bibliography

 Guttery, T.E. The Shuttleworth Collection. London: Wm. Carling & Co, 1969. 
 Lumsden, Alec. British Piston Engines and their Aircraft. Marlborough, Wiltshire: Airlife Publishing, 2003. .

External links

The Bristol Cherub - Flight, March 1923

Boxer engines
Cherub
1920s aircraft piston engines